ECLS may refer to:

Environmental Control and Life Support System, support system of crewed spacecraft
Extracorporeal life support, extracorporeal membrane oxygenation

See also
eCl@ss

Acronyms